The Reform Act, 2014 is legislation enacted by the Parliament of Canada on June 23, 2015, that amended the Constitution of Canada, specifically the Parliament of Canada Act, and the Canada Elections Act to increase the power and independence of MPs. The act was championed as a private members bill by Tory MP Michael Chong. It passed the House of Commons by a vote of 260–17 on February 25, 2015 and the Senate by a vote of 38–14, after attempts by Conservative Senators to kill the legislation failed.

Procedures
The Act amended the Canada Elections Act to require each party to designate a person or entity to approve the nominations of candidates, the original version of the bill would have stripped the party leader of the power to approve nominations, but that portion of the bill was watered down as a compromise so it could pass the House of Commons. As a result, the new provisions for approving candidacies still leave it open to parties to vest that power into the leader.

The Act also amended the Parliament of Canada Act (a part of the Constitution) to create four sets of provisions relating to:

 The expulsion/readmission of caucus members;
 The election and removal of the caucus chair;
 The removal of the party leader;
 The election of an interim leader.

At the first sitting of the House after an election, the members of each recognized party vote on whether any or all of the sets should apply to their caucuses. The provisions only applying to the caucuses that approve them was another compromise to ensure passage of the Act. The approval of the provisions by the caucuses is binding until Parliament dissolves, after which another vote is held.

The set of the provisions relating to the expulsion/readmission of caucus members are sections 49.2 and 49.3 of the Parliament of Canada Act. And declare that no member of a caucus may be expelled from it unless a majority of the members of that caucus vote to expel them in a secret ballot, the secret ballot is held after 20% of the members of the caucus sign a petition calling for the members' expulsion and deliver it to the caucus chair. The expelled member may be readmitted if either they win the next election as a candidate of the party, or if a majority of the caucus approves their re-admission in a secret ballot following a similar petition.

Section 49.4 provides for the election and removal of the caucus chair, declaring that after a general election, or if a vacancy arises in the office, the caucus must select a new caucus chair by majority vote in a secret ballot. It likewise provides for the removal of a caucus chair if a petition signed by at least 20% of the members of the caucus is delivered to them, and a majority of the caucus then votes to remove them via secret ballot. 49.4 also states that for any votes to elect or remove a caucus chair, the most senior MP in the caucus must preside.

Section 49.5 provides for a leadership review should a petition calling for one, signed by at least 20% of the caucus members, be delivered to the chair, who must immediately make the contents of the petition public. During a leadership review, MPs in the caucus vote through a secret ballot on whether the leader should be retained, and they are removed if they fail to get a majority vote in favour of retention. Subsection 49.5(4) and section 49.6 provides for the election of an interim leader following a vacancy in the position of leader, the interim leader serves until a permanent replacement is selected by the party through its own procedures.

Usage
The caucus member ejection provisions were first used when the Conservative caucus voted to eject Derek Sloan on January 20, 2021.

In February 2022, the leadership removal provisions were invoked for the first time by the Conservative caucus following the 2021 election, which used it to trigger a leadership review against, and remove, Erin O'Toole. During the review, 45 MPs voted to retain him against 73 who voted for his removal. Deputy Leader Candice Bergen was selected as interim leader.  O'Toole's removal marked the first time since the Reform Act was passed into law seven years prior, that a party caucus formally challenged and dismissed its leader.

References 

Constitution of Canada
Canadian election legislation
Canadian federal legislation
41st Canadian Parliament
2015 in Canadian politics
2015 in Canadian law